= Minarc =

Design studio

Minarc is a design studio founded by Ingjaldsdottir and Thorsteinsson in 1999. Situated in Santa Monica, California. the studio has earned acclaim for its approach to architecture and design. [2]

Minarc's portfolio spans a diverse range of projects, from small-scale renovations to large-scale new constructions, catering to residential, commercial, and public sectors alike. A distinctive feature of their work is the blending of indoor and outdoor spaces, the use of natural light, the integration of outdoor living areas, and the framing of views of nature.

Their design include the use of reclaimed wood, recycled glass, rubber tires, and cement panels, as well as other sustainable materials. Furthermore, the studio opts for natural cross-ventilation methods as opposed to conventional air conditioning systems.
